Purificación Carpinteyro Calderón is a Mexican politician.

Born on 1 May 1961 in the federal district municipality of Miguel Hidalgo, Purificación Carpinteyro Calderón received her Bachelor of Laws from Escuela Libre de Derecho in 1984, and her Master of Laws from Harvard Law School in 1989.  She was a member of the Party of the Democratic Revolution when she served as the proprietary deputy from Iztapalapa to the LXII Legislature of the Mexican Congress from 29 August 2012 through 31 August 2015.

References

1961 births
20th-century Mexican lawyers
21st-century Mexican lawyers
21st-century Mexican women politicians
Living people
Mexican women lawyers
Party of the Democratic Revolution politicians
Politicians from Mexico City
Women members of the Chamber of Deputies (Mexico)
Harvard Law School alumni
20th-century women lawyers
21st-century women lawyers
Members of the Chamber of Deputies (Mexico) for Mexico City
Deputies of the LXII Legislature of Mexico